Two conferences go by the name Faith and Freedom Conference:
 A yearly conference held by the Faith and Freedom Coalition
 A yearly conference held by the Knights of the Ku Klux Klan